Carlos Païta (10 March 1932 – 19 December 2015) was an Argentine conductor. He was born in Buenos Aires.

His father was originally from Hungary, his mother was a singer from Italy. At a young age, Païta attended rehearsals by Wilhelm Furtwängler at the Teatro Colón.  Later he studied conducting with Artur Rodziński.  He started his professional career at the Colón Theater in Buenos Aires.  He first conducted the Stuttgart Radio Symphony Orchestra in 1966 and moved permanently to Europe in 1968. He made his US debut with the Houston Symphony Orchestra in 1979.  As of 2003, he was resident in Geneva.
 
Paita was awarded the Grand Prix du Disque for his 1968 recoding on the London Records - Phase 4 Stereo Concert Series album A Wagner Festival.  This LP featured selections from Tristan und Isolde, The Flying Dutchman and Die Meistersinger von Nürnberg.

He was also awarded the Grand Prix du Disque for his 1978 LP recording of Berlioz's Symphonie Fantastique with the London Symphony Orchestra.

He is largely noted for a series of recordings issued on his own Lodia Records label. As of 2006, this label went out of business; these records are highly sought-after collectors’ items. 

He died in Geneva, Switzerland on 19 December 2015 at the age of 83.

Discography
 Beethoven, Coriolan Overture, London Philharmonic Orchestra
 Beethoven, Leonore Overture III, Netherlands Radio Philharmonic Orchestra
 Beethoven, Third Symphony ("Eroica"), Scottish National Orchestra
 Beethoven, Fifth Symphony, Philharmonic Symphony Orchestra
 Beethoven, Seventh Symphony, Philharmonic Symphony Orchestra
 Berlioz, Symphonie Fantastique, London Symphony Orchestra
 Borodin, In the Steppes of Central Asia, Philharmonic Symphony Orchestra
 Brahms, First Symphony, National Philharmonic Orchestra
 Bruckner, Eighth Symphony, Philharmonic Symphony Orchestra
 Dvořák, Seventh Symphony, Philharmonic Symphony Orchestra
 Dvořák, Eighth Symphony, Royal Philharmonic Orchestra
 Dvořák, Ninth Symphony ("From the New World"), Royal Philharmonic Orchestra
 Glinka, Ruslan and Ludmilla (overture), National Philharmonic Orchestra
 Mahler, First Symphony ("Titan"), Royal Philharmonic Orchestra
 Mussorgsky, Pictures at an Exhibition, National Philharmonic Orchestra
 Rossini, Overtures, Royal Philharmonic Orchestra
 Schubert, Ninth Symphony ("Great"), Royal Philharmonic Orchestra
 Tchaikovsky, Capriccio Italien, Russian Philharmonic Orchestra
 Tchaikovsky, Hamlet Overture-Fantasia, Russian Philharmonic Orchestra
 Tchaikovsky, Marche Slave, Russian Philharmonic Orchestra
 Tchaikovsky, Romeo and Juliet, Russian Philharmonic Orchestra
 Tchaikovsky, Fourth Symphony, Moscow New Russian Orchestra
 Tchaikovsky, Sixth Symphony ("Pathetique"), National Philharmonic Orchestra
 Verdi, Requiem, Royal Philharmonic Orchestra
 Wagner, Götterdämmerung (extracts), Ute Vinzing, James King, Philharmonia Orchestra
 Wagner, Die Meistersinger Overture, Philharmonic Symphony Orchestra
 Wagner, Rienzi Overture, Netherlands Radio Philharmonic Orchestra
 Wagner, The Flying Dutchman Overture, Philharmonic Symphony Orchestra
 Wagner, Tristan und Isolde (Prelude and Liebestod), Philharmonic Symphony Orchestra

References

External links
 Homepage (with sound samples)

Argentine conductors (music)
Male conductors (music)
1932 births
2015 deaths
Musicians from Buenos Aires
20th-century conductors (music)
21st-century conductors (music)
Argentine people of Hungarian descent
Argentine people of Italian descent